The albums discography of British-Australian recording artist Olivia Newton-John consists of twenty-six studio albums, six live albums, fourteen compilations and six soundtracks. According to Billboard, Newton-John is the 44th most successful artist of all time. She is also listed as the 36th top female artist on the Billboard 200 all-time female list. To date, she has sold an estimated 100 million records worldwide, making her one of the world's best-selling artists of all time.

"Physical" was crowned as the Song of the Decade by Billboard, which also spent 10 weeks atop the Hot 100. According to the RIAA, Newton-John has sold 27 million certified albums and singles in the United States. She has amassed five number-one and ten other top-ten Hot 100 singles, and two number-one Billboard 200 solo albums. She starred in Grease, which featured one of the most successful soundtracks in Hollywood history.

Studio albums

Soundtrack albums

Live albums

Compilation albums

Extended plays

Box sets

Special releases

See also
Olivia Newton-John singles discography
Olivia Newton-John videography

References

External links
 
 
 

Discographies of Australian artists
Pop music discographies